Philip Eastwood (born 6 April 1978 in Blackburn) is an English former professional footballer who played in the Football League as a striker for Burnley.

Career
Eastwood was born in Whalley and attended Pleckgate High School in Blackburn. As a schoolboy, he was with Blackburn Rovers before joining Burnley as a YTS trainee when he left school. While at Burnley he won a Pontins League Second Division winners' medal with the reserve team,
 had loan spells at non-league sides Leek Town, Telford United and Kettering Town, and made 16 first-team appearances, scoring once.

Released at the end of the 1998–99 season, he went on to play for Conference clubs Morecambe and Southport, then spent four seasons with Stalybridge Celtic. He scored 63 goals from 153 appearances in all competitions, and spent time on loan at Hyde United and Ashton United, before signing for Rossendale United in 2006. Over his three seasons with the club, he averaged 20 goals a season, was their leading scorer, and was player-manager from November 2008 to the end of the 2008–09 season, when he left the post by mutual consent after Rossendale finished bottom of the Northern Premier League Division One North. He then joined Bamber Bridge as a player.

In January 2009, Eastwood joined Preston North End as technical youth development officer, to work with the youngest players in the club's centre of excellence.

References

External links
 

English footballers
1978 births
Living people
Footballers from Blackburn
Association football forwards
Burnley F.C. players
Leek Town F.C. players
Telford United F.C. players
Kettering Town F.C. players
Morecambe F.C. players
Southport F.C. players
Stalybridge Celtic F.C. players
Hyde United F.C. players
Ashton United F.C. players
Rossendale United F.C. players
Bamber Bridge F.C. players
English Football League players
National League (English football) players
Preston North End F.C. non-playing staff